The Dinichthyloidea is an extinct superfamily of placoderms, armored fish most diverse during the Devonian. However, the term is no longer in use, as modern cladistical methods have produced alternative phylogenetic trees of Brachythoraci with new subdivisions.

Systematics
 Basal genus Erromenosteus
 Family Dinichthyidae
 Family Trematosteidae
 Family Rhachiosteidae
 Family Pachyosteidae
 Family Titanichthyidae
 Family Bungartiidae
 Family Selenosteidae
 Family Mylostomatidae

References

Arthrodires
Vertebrate superfamilies